

Martin Wandel (15 April 1892 – 14 January 1943) was a German general  in the Wehrmacht during World War II. He was also a recipient of the Knight's Cross of the Iron Cross of Nazi Germany. Wandel was killed on 14 January 1943 when his command post was overrun in part of the encirclement in the Battle of Stalingrad.

Awards 

 Knight's Cross of the Iron Cross on 23 November 1941 as Generalmajor and commander of 121. Infanterie-Division

References

Citations

Bibliography

 

1892 births
1943 deaths
German Army personnel of World War I
Prussian Army personnel
Recipients of the clasp to the Iron Cross, 1st class
Recipients of the Knight's Cross of the Iron Cross
German Army personnel killed in World War II
Military personnel from Berlin
People from the Province of Brandenburg
German Army generals of World War II
Generals of Artillery (Wehrmacht)
Reichswehr personnel